Bruckless railway station served Bruckless in County Donegal, Ireland.

The station opened on 18 October 1893 on the Donegal Railway Company line from Donegal to Killybegs.

It closed on 1 January 1960.

Routes

References

Disused railway stations in County Donegal
Railway stations opened in 1893
Railway stations closed in 1960